The Pearl Harbor National Wildlife Refuge is a National Wildlife Refuge on the island of Oahu, Hawaii. It was created in 1972 to mitigate the wildlife resource disturbances caused by construction of the Honolulu International Airport Reef Runway.  The Refuge includes three units, the Honouliuli, Waiwa and Kalaeloa.  The Honouliuli and Waiawa Units are managed under a cooperative agreement with the United States Navy. The Kalaeloa Unit was established during Base Realignment and Closure proceedings in 2001. Through these cooperative efforts with the Federal Aviation Administration, the State of Hawaii, and the U.S. Navy, the U.S. Fish and Wildlife Service made Pearl Harbor NWR a reality.

Landscape and natural resources

The Honouliuli Unit contains two freshwater wetland impoundments that are intensively managed to provide habitat for a variety of waterbirds, including Hawaii's endangered waterbirds and migrant waterfowl. These two impoundments contain nesting islands, aquatic vegetation and mudflats that are used as nesting and foraging areas by various waterbird species throughout the year.

The Waiawa Unit is composed of two brackish ponds, one of which is primarily managed for the endangered aeo (a subspecies of the common black-winged stilt, Himantopus mexicanus knudseni). However, the pond’s estuarine environment is ideal for establishing a host of food resources for four endangered waterbird species found there.

The Kalaeloa Unit, once part of the former Barbers Point Naval Air Station, was added to the Pearl Harbor NWR to protect the endangered Ewa Hinahina (Achyranthes splendens var. rotundata) and ʻAkoko (Euphorbia skottsbergii). This area of raised limestone coral reef contains the last remaining ancient coastal dry shrubland plant communities that were once widespread throughout the Ewa Plain.  It is also home to anchialine pools, which are pools of saltwater connected to the ocean via minute cracks in the limestone. These are home to the ōpaeula (Hawaiian shrimp, Halocaridina rubra).

Native coastal plants still flourish at Kalaeloa amongst two endangered plant species. The largest population of Akoko (Euphorbia skottsbergii) on Oahu and the second largest population of endangered Ewa Hinahina can be found within this unit. Native plants include the night-blooming Maiapilo (Capparis sandwichiana) with its beautiful fragrant flowers; the Hinahina, a very dense, soft, and silky-looking plant; and Naio (Myoporum sandwicense), one of the few natives that is a strong competitor against alien grasses.

Public use

To protect the delicate habitats, the refuge is closed to visitors.

Notes

References

Protected areas of Oahu
National Wildlife Refuges in Hawaii
Wetlands of Hawaii
Protected areas established in 1972
Landforms of Oahu
1972 establishments in Hawaii